Susan Diane Ruttan (née Dunsrud; born September 16, 1948) is an American actress.  She is best known for her role as Roxanne Melman on L.A. Law (1986–1993), for which she was nominated four times for a Primetime Emmy Award.

Life and career
Ruttan was born in Oregon City, Oregon, the daughter of Helen Manis, a nurse, and Daryl Dunrud, a logger. She graduated from University of Oregon and University of California, Santa Cruz.

Ruttan played Roxanne Melman on L.A. Law  from 1986 to 1993. She reprised the role in 2002 for a TV reunion, L.A. Law: The Movie. She earned four nominations for Primetime Emmy Award for Outstanding Supporting Actress in a Drama Series for her performance in show.

Ruttan first attracted significant attention playing the scheming wife of George Jefferson's dry-cleaning archrival, Gil Cunningham, on The Jeffersons. Other television appearances included episodes of Buffy the Vampire Slayer, AfterMash, Bosom Buddies, Third Rock from the Sun, Remington Steele, Yes, Dear, Newhart and Gilmore Girls. Buffy creator Joss Whedon cast numerous show alumni in 2008's Dr. Horrible's Sing-Along Blog, including Ruttan who appeared briefly in a non-speaking role.

Ruttan had a small comedic role in the teen comedy feature film Bad Manners (aka: Growing Pains) (1984), and the 1990 romantic comedy Funny About Love starring Gene Wilder. She played convicted killer Genene Jones in the television movie Deadly Medicine (1991). She has also appeared in an episode of Hannah Montana ("Promma Mia"). Her most dramatic role to date was in the 2004 remake of Helter Skelter, in which she played the mother of Linda Kasabian.  In 2009, she appeared in the movie, Prayers for Bobby.

Personal life
Ruttan has been married twice. Her first marriage, to Mel Ruttan in 1967, ended with his death in a motorcycle accident three years later. She kept his surname as her professional name. Her second marriage, to Joe Warbis, lasted from 1990 to 1993. She is the mother of Jackson Ruttan (born May 19, 1993), whom she adopted.

Filmography

Film

Television

References

External links

1948 births
Living people
Actresses from Oregon
American film actresses
American television actresses
People from Oregon City, Oregon
20th-century American actresses
21st-century American actresses
University of Oregon alumni
University of California, Santa Cruz alumni